Tondong is a settlement on the Sarawak Kanan (right hand, going upstream) river in the Bau district of Sarawak, Malaysia.

Tondong has about twenty shophouses on roads perpendicular to the river, but some are now used as residences only. The town was flooded to a depth of 4.6 metres in 1963 and to 3.5 metres in 1976.

Sir Henry Keppel in 1846 describes Tondong as “quite a new settlement”, and the principal Chinese station in the area.

Neighbouring settlements include:

References

Towns in Sarawak